State Trunk Highway 44 (often called Highway 44, STH-44 or WIS 44) is a state highway in the U.S. state of Wisconsin. It runs in a diagonal southwest–northeast direction in east-central Wisconsin from Pardeeville to Oshkosh.

Route description
WIS 44 begins in Pardeeville, in Columbia County at the junction with WIS 22.  It heads northeast out of town. It has a brief cosigning with WIS 33 for a mile before continuing to head northeast.  WIS 33's control cities at this point are Portage to the west and Fox Lake to the east. WIS 44 crosses into Green Lake County at Hwy HH, just south of Dalton.  WIS 44 continues northeast to Kingston.

WIS 73 north heads to Princeton. It is cosigned with WIS 73, forming a wrong-way concurrency for roughly  through the unincorporated town of Manchester before WIS 73 cuts south to head to Randolph and Columbus. About  after the WIS 73 split, WIS 44 enters the city of Markesan. After passing Little Green Lake just north of Markesan, WIS 44 heads east, crosses into Fond du Lac County at Searle Road, then enters the town of Fairwater. After another , WIS 44 meets up with WIS 44. WIS 49 south heads to Brandon and Waupun. At the junction with WIS 23, WIS 49 north cosigns with WIS 23 west to head to Green Lake and Berlin. Meanwhile, WIS 44 has a brief cosign with WIS 23 east, which heads to Rosendale and Fond du Lac, before it cuts north along Douglas Street on Ripon's east side. WIS 44, as it leaves the city limits, heads northeast. Just shy of the unincorporated town of Pickett, WIS 44 crosses into Winnebago County. WIS 44 continues roughly another  heading northeast to Oshkosh.

As WIS 44 enters the Oshkosh city limits on Ripon Road, it meets up with WIS 91, which heads west to Waukau and Berlin. It has a brief  cosign with it until the junction with Interstate 41 where WIS 91 ends.  WIS 44 follows South Park Avenue from I-41 to Ohio Street. WIS 44 then turns north along Ohio to cross the Fox River. At the Fox River, the road becomes Wisconsin Street. WIS 44 then turns east on Irving Avenue to meet US 45, Jackson Street, where it ends.

History
Initially, WIS 44 traveled from Dalton to Princeton via part of its present-day routing and present-day WIS 73. The route southwest of Dalton was not opened yet. In 1919, the route extended southwest to Portage. In 1920, WIS 33 superseded the westernmost portion of WIS 44 from Portage to Marcellon. In 1924, both of WIS 44's termini were extended. The route extended south to WIS 10 (now US 51) in North Leeds via part of present-day WIS 44 and WIS 22. On the other hand, the route no longer served Princeton. Instead, it served Oshkosh via much of its present-day routing. In 1947, WIS 22 superseded the southernmost portion of WIS 44 from Pardeeville to North Leeds.

Major intersections

See also

References

External links

044
Transportation in Columbia County, Wisconsin
Transportation in Green Lake County, Wisconsin
Transportation in Fond du Lac County, Wisconsin
Transportation in Winnebago County, Wisconsin